The Loser is a hand gesture made by extending the right thumb and index fingers, leaving the other fingers closed to create the letter L, interpreted as "loser", and generally given as a demeaning sign. Sometimes this is accompanied by raising the hand to the giver's forehead, and sometimes it is done when resting the head in one's own hands.

The gesture was popular in the 1990s, partly popularized by the 1994 movie Ace Ventura: Pet Detective and 1993's The Sandlot, as well as the 1999 Smash Mouth song "All Star," of which the song's first verse contains the lyric "she was looking kind of dumb with her finger and her thumb in the shape of an 'L' on her forehead."

Usage of an "L" handsign in specific contexts 
The gesture is mentioned in the lyrics of Smash Mouth's hit single "All Star" (1999).

The gesture is used in the logo of Glee to form the logo's L. It is used as a sign of affection among the fans of that show ('Gleeks').

In The Simpsons episode "Pranks and Greens", Lisa Simpson shows this sign several times, once while cycling, towards Bart Simpson and Andy Hamilton, mocking especially the latter boy's way of life.

In the Philippines it was used by supporters of Corazon Aquino during her presidential candidacy against the then-President Ferdinand Marcos; the "L" gesture meaning "laban" (translated, "fight" or "contest" which could refer to fighting against Marcos). It was readopted during the presidential campaign of Benigno Aquino III, son of Corazon Aquino.

Pro-wrestler Zack Ryder uses the gesture as one half of his own "Long Island" sign ("L" gesture on his right hand means "Long" and an extended index finger on his left hand means "Island"). Wrestlers The Bella Twins also use the gesture.

The gesture is also used by fans of Polish football club Legia Warsaw, whose logo is an "L" inside a circle. Supporters of the University of Louisville and its athletic program use a slightly different version of the gesture, in which the index and middle fingers are raised together.

One of its first appearances  in video games is in a team-based shooter called Team Fortress 2 where it is executed in the form of a taunt by soldier class if the player presses "g" key whilst holding a rocket launcher.

In the game Fortnite Battle Royale, there is an emote called "Take the L", which uses the Loser gesture on a dance.

In the games Super Smash Bros 4/Ultimate, during Luigi's Palutena's Guidance on the Palutena's Temple stage, Viridi comments on an "unfortunate 'L' on his forehead", referring to the well-known green L on his cap. Pit even counterclaims that it stands for "winner", contrasting the point the goddess of nature was trying to prove.

In a Saturday Night Live skit on 7 November 2020, to commemorate the election win by Joe Biden, Jim Carrey and Maya Rudolph do the "L" gesture at the end of the skit.

In Brazil, the "L" is the political symbol of voting in Lula da Silva for president. Also, in Brazil, Germán Cano, soccer player from Fluminense, use the L to commemorate when he scores a goal, because of his son "Lorenzo". Some people believe Cano supports Lula, but this is false.

Also in Brazil, an "L" handsign is used for cheering for Brazilian esports players from LOUD organization (e.g. during "VCT 2023: LOCK//IN" event in São Paulo).

See also
Pollice verso
Thumbs up

References

Sources

Notes

External links
 

Hand gestures 
1990s fads and trends